Mr. Heli, fully titled in Japan as  is a multidirectional scrolling shooter developed and published in arcades in 1984 by Irem. It was released in North America as Battle Chopper.

Gameplay

Players control a wacky fighter chopper named Mr. Heli, while shooting enemies, collecting power-ups, and defeating bosses to advance levels.

Ports

Mr. Heli was ported for the Commodore 64, Amiga, Amstrad CPC, ZX Spectrum, and Atari ST by Firebird, as well as for the PC Engine in Japan by Irem. This version was re-released for the Wii Virtual Console on March 18, 2008, only in Japan. It came back for the  Wii U Virtual Console on April 15, 2015, in Japan and premiered in the United States and Europe on February 1, 2018.

Reception 
In Japan, Game Machine listed Mr. Heli on their January 15, 1988 issue as being the fifth most-successful table arcade unit of the month.

Ciarán Brennan of Your Sinclair magazine reviewed the arcade game, calling it "a lovely little game" that is "very imaginative and beautifully" paced. ACE magazine reviewed the PC Engine version in 1989, rating it 890 out of 1000 and listing it as one of the top five best games available for the console.

Legacy
Mr. Heli later appeared in the Japan-only Game Boy title Shuyaku Sentai Irem Fighter, along with other characters from the game, as well as characters from three other Irem franchises: R-Type, Ninja Spirit and Hammerin' Harry. Mr. Heli was mentioned in one of the billboards seen in the final stage of Irem's Vigilante and also appeared in R-Type Final as a playable ship.

References

External links
 Arcade version

Mr. Heli no Daibouken at Arcade History
Battle Chopper at Arcade History
 Home versions
Mr.Heli at Atari Mania

Mr.Heli at CPC Game Reviews

1987 video games
Amiga games
Amstrad CPC games
Arcade video games
Atari ST games
Commodore 64 games
Helicopter video games
Irem games
TurboGrafx-16 games
Scrolling shooters
ZX Spectrum games
Video games developed in Japan
Virtual Console games
Virtual Console games for Wii U